Lepidoblepharis intermedius is a species of gecko, a lizard in the family Sphaerodactylidae. The species is endemic to northern South America.

Geographic range
L. intermedius is found in Colombia and Ecuador.

Description
Dorsally, L. intermedius is brown with darker and lighter variegations. There is a straight whitish streak across the nape of the neck. Ventrally it is pale brown, except for the throat which is whitish.

Reproduction
L. intermedius is oviparous.

References

Further reading
Boulenger GA (1914). "On a second Collection of Batrachians and Reptiles made by Dr. H. G. F. Spurrell, F.Z.S., in the Choco, Colombia". Proceedings of the Zoological Society of London 1914: 813-817 + Plates I-II. (Lepidoblepharis intermedius, new species, p. 814 + Plate I, figure 2).
Castro-Herrera, Fernando; Vargas-Salinas, Fernando (2008). "Anfibios y reptiles en el departamento del Valle del Cauca, Colombia ". Biota Colombiana 9 (2): 251–277. (in Spanish, with an abstract in English).
Valencia-Zuleta A, Jaramillo-Martínez AF, Echeverry-Bocanegra A, Viáfra-Vega R, Hernández-Córdoba O, Cardona-Botero VE, Gutiérez-Zúñiga J, Castro-Herrera F (2014). "Conservation status of the herpetofauna, protected areas, and current problems in Valle del Cauca, Colombia". Amphibian & Reptile Conservation 8: 1–18.

Lepidoblepharis
Reptiles of Colombia
Reptiles of Ecuador
Reptiles described in 1914
Taxa named by George Albert Boulenger